The 1914 Penn Quakers football team was an American football team that represented the University of Pennsylvania in the 1914 college football season. In their second season under head coach George H. Brooke, the Quakers compiled a 4–4–1 record and were outscored by a total of 121 to 89.

Schedule

References

Penn
Penn Quakers football seasons
Penn Quakers football